Danielle Roche OAM (born 25 May 1970 in Melbourne, Victoria) is a former field hockey player, who was a member of the Australian Women’s Hockey Team, commonly known as the "Hockeyroos", which won the gold medal at the 1996 Summer Olympics in Atlanta, Georgia.

Personal
Roche was born in Melbourne on 25 May 1970. She is the daughter of Ken Roche, who was a hurdler at the 1964 Summer Olympics and won two Commonwealth Games gold medals. She had a seven-year relationship with Australian model and television personality Deborah Hutton until their break up in December 2007.

Hockey career
Roche made her debut as a 19 year old for the Australian team in 1989 in the Australia vs New Zeaalnd series. She was a member of the Australian Women’s Hockey Team that won the gold medal at the 1996 Summer Olympics in Atlanta, Georgia. She was an Australian Institute of Sport hockey scholarship holder and played for MCC Hockey Club.

Business career
Roche has held finance and commercial positions with Telstra, has been a Director at UBS, a partner at Evans and Partners. Roche is a Director of a privately owned fraud and risk management business.

Community leadership
In 2017, Roche was named Chair of the National Australia Day Council.

Sports administration
Roche was a Hockey Australia Director for seven years until she was appointed to the St Kilda Football Club Board in 2012. She was appointed to the Australian Sports Commission Board on 4 May 2016. Roche is a Trust Member of  Victorian State Sports Centres.

In March 2017, Roche announced that she was standing for the President of the Australian Olympic Committee. It was first time that John Coates has been challenged for the Presidency, a position held since 1990.

References

External links
 
 

1970 births
Living people
Australian female field hockey players
Field hockey players at the 1996 Summer Olympics
Olympic field hockey players of Australia
Olympic gold medalists for Australia
Sportswomen from Victoria (Australia)
Olympic medalists in field hockey
Recipients of the Medal of the Order of Australia
Field hockey players from Melbourne
Medalists at the 1996 Summer Olympics
Australian LGBT sportspeople
Lesbian sportswomen
LGBT field hockey players
21st-century LGBT people